The 2017 Båstad Challenger was a professional tennis tournament played on clay courts. It was the second edition of the tournament which was part of the 2017 ATP Challenger Tour. It took place in Båstad, Sweden between 10 and 15 July 2017.

Singles main-draw entrants

Seeds

 1 Rankings are as of 3 July 2017.

Other entrants
The following players received wildcards into the singles main draw:
  Markus Eriksson
  Carl Söderlund
  Elias Ymer
  Mikael Ymer

The following players received entry into the singles main draw as alternates:
  Calvin Hemery
  Kamil Majchrzak
 
The following players received entry from the qualifying draw:
  Isak Arvidsson
  Hubert Hurkacz
  Juan Ignacio Londero
  Fred Simonsson

Champions

Singles

  Dušan Lajović def.  Leonardo Mayer 6–2, 7–6(7–4).

Doubles

  Tuna Altuna /  Václav Šafránek def.  Sriram Balaji /  Vijay Sundar Prashanth 6–1, 6–4.

References

Båstad Challenger
Båstad Challenger
Bast